Square Hospital is a private hospital in Dhaka, Bangladesh. It is one of three high-end private hospital in Bangladesh, the other being Apollo Hospital Dhaka and United Hospital, Dhaka. Tapan Chowdhury is the managing director of the hospital.

History
Square Hospital was founded on 16 December 2006 by Samson H. Chowdhury of Square Group. It was 300 (Now 400) bed hospital. It was founded in partnership with Methodist Le Bonheur Healthcare, Memphis, Care IVF Centre of Singapore, and Christian Medical College & Hospital, Vellore. It is also partnered with Raffles Hospital.

In 2008, former Prime Minister Sheikh Hasina received medical treatment at Square Hospital while she was detained by the Caretaker Government. On 11 January 2012, the hospital was fined by the Department of Environment over noise pollution from its generators.

References

Hospitals in Dhaka
2006 establishments in Bangladesh
Private hospitals in Bangladesh
Hospitals established in 2006